30th Anniversary: The Perfect Singles Box is a box set by Japanese entertainer Miho Nakayama. Released through King Records on July 22, 2015, to commemorate Nakayama's 30th anniversary, the box set compiles all of Nakayama's singles from 1985 to 2000 in 40 CDs. Each CD is packaged in a reprint of the single's original vinyl cover; singles originally released on mini CD only have been given new vinyl-style covers. Also included is a DVD containing live clips of the singles.

The box set peaked at No. 169 on Oricon's albums chart.

Track listing 

 DVD tracks 1–4 from Virgin Flight '86: Miho Nakayama First Concert
 DVD tracks 5–9 from Catch Me: Miho Nakayama Live '88
 DVD tracks 10–12 from Whuu! Natural Live at Budokan '89
 DVD tracks 13–14 from Miho Nakayama Concert Tour '91: Miho the Future, Miho the Nature
 DVD tracks 15–18 from Live in Mellow: Miho Nakayama Concert Tour '92
 DVD tracks 19–20 from Miho Nakayama Concert Tour '93: On My Mind
 DVD tracks 21–25 from Miho Nakayama Concert Tour '95: F
 DVD tracks 26–27 from Miho Nakayama Concert Tour '96: Sound of Lip
 DVD tracks 28–29 from Miho Nakayama Concert Tour '98: Live O Live

Charts

References

External links
 
 
 

2015 compilation albums
Miho Nakayama compilation albums
Japanese-language compilation albums
King Records (Japan) compilation albums